Sibel is a Turkish female given name. People named Sibel include:

Sibel Adalı, Turkish-American computer scientist
Sibel Arslan (born 1980), Swiss-Turkish politician and lawyer
Sibel Alaş (born 1973), Turkish pop singer
Sibel Can (born 1970), Turkish folk singer
Sibel Duman (born 1990), Turkish footballer
Sibel Egemen (born 1958), Turkish singer
Sibel Edmonds, founder of NSWBC
Sibel Galindez (born 1967), American actress
Sibel Güler (born 1984), Bulgarian-born Turkish taekwondo practitioner
Sibel Karameke (born 1995), Turkish handball and beach handball o-player
Sibel Kekilli (born 1980), German actress of Turkish descent
Sibel Kızavul (born 1993), Turkish volleyball player
Sibel Kolçak (born 1990), Turkish football referee
Sibel Özkan (born 1988), Turkish weightlifter
Sibel Redzep (born 1987), Macedonian-born Turkish-Swedish singer
Sibel Siber (born 1960), Turkish Cypriot politician
Sibel Şimşek (born 1984), Turkish weightlifter
Esra Sibel Tezkan (born 1993), Turkish-German women's footballer
Sibel Tüzün (born 1971), Turkish rock singer
Zeynep Sibel Algan (born 1955), Turkish diplomat

See also
 Sibel (film), a 2018 Turkish film

References

Turkish feminine given names